Michael Di Pasqua (May 4, 1953 – August 29, 2016) was an American cool jazz drummer and percussionist born in Orlando, Florida, probably better known for his work with Zoot Sims, Al Cohn and Gerry Mulligan, among others.

Discography

As leader
 Double Image, Double Image (Inner City, 1977)
 Double Image, Dawn (ECM, 1979)
 Gallery, Gallery (ECM, 1981)

As sideman
With Jan Garbarek
 Wayfarer (ECM, 1983)
 It's OK to Listen to the Gray Voice (ECM, 1985)

With Eberhard Weber
 Later That Evening (ECM, 1982)
 Endless Days (ECM, 2001)
 Résumé (ECM, 2012)

With others
 Siegfried Fietz, Ueber Den Tod Hinaus (Abakus, 1983)
 Volker Kriegel, Schoene Aussichten (Mood, 1983)
 Marian McPartland, Live at the Carlyle (Prevue, 1999)
 Gerry Mulligan, Watching & Waiting (DRG, 1999)
 Adelhard Roidinger, Schattseite (ECM, 1982)
 Ralph Towner, Old Friends, New Friends (ECM, 1979)

References

2. Obituary Legacy Hospital

American jazz drummers
Cool jazz drummers
1953 births
2016 deaths